Bruno Alves (born 1981) is a Portuguese football centre-back.

Bruno Alves may also refer to:

 Bruno Alves (footballer, born 1990), Portuguese football midfielder
 Bruno Alves (footballer, born 1991), Brazilian football centre-back
 Bruno Alves (footballer, born 1992), Brazilian football forward